Lynelle Jann Briggs,  (born 23 June 1957) is a former Australian Public Service Commissioner. She was chief executive of Medicare from 2009 until 2011, when Medicare was integrated into the Department of Human Services.

Life and career
In the 1980s, Briggs spent two years working for the New Zealand Treasury.

Between 2001 and 2004, Briggs was a Deputy Secretary in the Department of Transport and Regional Services. In November 2004, she was appointed the Australian Public Service Commissioner. Then, from August 2009 to June 2011, Briggs was the Chief Executive to Medicare Australia. During her time as head of Medicare, Briggs worked alongside Finn Pratt and Carolyn Hogg to integrate Medicare Australia, the Department of Human Services, Centrelink and CRS Australia into one department for better service design and delivery outcomes for Australians.

In 2012, she was appointed to lead an inquiry into building site safety in Canberra, her report of the inquiry recommended many changes to ACT construction training, enforcement and culture.

Briggs is currently a board member of the Australian Rail Track Corporation.

In October 2018, Briggs was appointed a Royal Commissioner on the Royal Commission into Aged Care Quality and Safety.

Awards
Briggs was made an Officer of the Order of Australia in January 2013 for distinguished service to public administration, particularly through leadership in the development of public service performance and professionalism.

References

1957 births
Living people
Australian public servants
Officers of the Order of Australia
University of Sydney alumni
People from Mudgee